Henry Oswald Hodgson FRCO (6 November 1886 - 21 August 1975) was an organist and composer based in England.

Life

He was born on 6 November 1886 in Scawby, Lincolnshire, the son of Annie Ellen née Conran (1846–1930) and Revd. Samuel Edward Hodgson (1843–1905).

He studied organ at Lincoln Cathedral under George Bennett until 1914.

He married Rosamund Jocelyn Orde née Mangin (1894-1975) in 1916 in Ripon. They had one daughter Susette Mangin Hodgson (1917-2000).

Appointments
Organist of St. Nicholas' Church, Lincoln ???? - 1911
Organist of St. Peter at Arches, Lincoln 1911 - 1914
Organist of St. Michael's Church, Alnwick 1914 - 1920
Organist of Selby Abbey 1920 - 1921
Organist of All Saints' Church, Leighton Buzzard 1921 - 1928
Organist of St Mary's Church, Nottingham 1928 - 1954

Compositions

He composed:
Magnificat and Nunc Dimittis in C
Fantasia on a Christmas Theme
Communion Setting in F
Great is the Lord Jehovah
Grant to us, Lord.

References

1886 births
1975 deaths
English organists
British male organists
Fellows of the Royal College of Organists
English male composers
20th-century English composers
20th-century organists
20th-century British male musicians